The 13 pounder 9 cwt anti-aircraft gun became the standard mobile British anti-aircraft gun of the World War I era, especially in theatres outside Britain.

History 
Earlier anti-aircraft guns based on 13 pounder and 18 pounder guns proved unsatisfactory, primarily due to their low muzzle velocities. On 19 August 1915 the Army Council proposed adapting existing 18-pounder guns (3.3-inch bore) to use 13-pounder (3-inch) shells, thus meeting the requirement for higher velocity.

A slight neck was introduced in the 18 pounder cartridge to hold the slightly narrower 13 pounder shell in place.

The initial Mk III mounting was based on the 13 pounder Mk II anti-aircraft mounting, but proved to be not strong enough for the extra power of the 18 pounder cartridge.

Several guns are known to have been mounted on 2-wheeled high-angle field carriages and deployed on the Italian front. Hogg & Thurston state that they could theoretically be used as anti-aircraft guns, field guns or howitzers, but they were not officially introduced and may have been of an experimental nature. Routledge states that the carriage was improvised because some of 4th AA Group's guns had arrived in Italy without mountings.

Combat use 

As World War I progressed, it was replaced in the home air defence of England (against German heavy bombers) by the more powerful QF 3 inch 20 cwt gun, but continued in all other theatres. It was usually deployed mounted on medium lorries such as the Thornycroft Type J with a speed of 18 miles per hour, in sections of 2 guns.

On the Western Front they were typically used to protect troop columns, airfields, bases, supply dumps and observation balloons.

As important as the raw performance of the gun itself was the new technology being developed to allow fast calculation of aircraft height and predict where it would be when the shell arrived near it. Modern aircraft could fly at over 100 miles per hour and to 20,000 ft (much lower over the battlefield) by 1918, which made the old reliable artillery shooting techniques obsolete. The shell took 10.1 seconds to reach  fired at 25° above horizontal, 15.5 seconds to reach  at 40°, 22.1 seconds to reach  at 55°. Hence the aircraft position had to be calculated 10–22 seconds in advance and fuzes needed to be set to explode at the correct height.

By the end of World War I, a 13 pounder AA Section was accompanied by 2 Wilson-Dalby Trackers with a rudimentary electronic computer to provide tachymetric prediction, a UB2 rangefinder, a Height/Fuze Indicator (HFI) and an Identification telescope. German fighters countered by attacking at low level—a few hundred feet. AA guns would continue to fire but the shells would then explode over the heads of those they were defending. But it brought attacking aircraft within range of defensive machine guns. Few aircraft were actually directly shot down, each requiring an average 4,000–4,500 shells, but guns were often employed in aerial barrages to deny an airspace to aircraft rather than to simply shoot down individually targeted aircraft. Brigadier Routledge notes that "in the BEF [i.e. on the Western Front] stress was laid on long-range deterrent fire; indeed in Fourth Army this was the BRA's stated policy. 'Kills' were therefore less common. Moreover, gun and fighter zones were not separated, as in Britain, and this made set plans for action less workable".

Routledge further comments that in World War I British cooperation between infantry and anti-aircraft sections was generally rudimentary. However, he points out a successful integration in the Allied advance on the Piave in Italy in late 1918, where S and V Batteries of 4th AA group used their 13 pdr 9 cwt guns to  provide mobile air and ground fire in close support of infantry. This tactic later became common in World War II.

At the end of World War I, a total of 306 were in service worldwide, 232 of these on the Western Front (out of a total 348 AA guns there).

Performance 
The following table compares the gun's performance with the other British World War I anti-aircraft guns:-

See also 
List of anti-aircraft guns

Surviving examples 

13 pdr 9 cwt on Mk III mounting on a Thornycroft J Type lorry at Imperial War Museum Duxford, UK.

Notes

References

Bibliography 
 Official History of The Ministry of Munitions, 1922. Volume X The Supply of Munitions. Part VI Anti-Aircraft Supplies. Facsimile reprint by Imperial War Museum and Naval & Military Press 2007. 
 General Sir Martin Farndale, History of the Royal Regiment of Artillery. Western Front 1914–18. London: Royal Artillery Institution, 1986. .
 General Sir Martin Farndale, History of the Royal Regiment of Artillery : Forgotten Fronts and the Home Base 1914–18. London:The Royal Artillery Institution, 1988. 
 I.V. Hogg & L.F. Thurston, British Artillery Weapons & Ammunition 1914–1918. London:Ian Allan, 1972. 
 Brigadier NW Routledge, History of the Royal Regiment of Artillery. Anti-Aircraft Artillery, 1914–55. London: Brassey's, 1994.

External links 

World War I artillery of the United Kingdom
World War I anti-aircraft guns
76 mm artillery